Ahmed Samater (born 13 January 1980 in Khobar, Eastern Province, Saudi Arabia) is a professional Saudi Arabian basketball player.  He plays for the Al-Hilal Sports Club of the D1 Saudi Arabia.

Career overview
Ahmed Samater grew up in Khobar, Eastern Province, Saudi Arabia. Throughout his career he played professional basketball in Saudi Arabia and Bahrain. Altogether, he played professional basketball  for the following teams:
 2005-08 Al Qadsia 
 2004-05 Al Ahli Manama 
 2009–14 Al Hilal Riyadh 
 2014-15 Al Nasr

Achievements
 2004-05, 2011 Saudi Arabia national basketball team

References

1980 births
Living people
Saudi Arabian men's basketball players
People from Khobar
Power forwards (basketball)
Centers (basketball)
20th-century Saudi Arabian people
21st-century Saudi Arabian people